Mei Zhibin (born 27 April 1963) is a former Chinese figure skater who competed at the 1988 Winter Olympics with her partner Li Wei. They finished last among the 14 pair skaters.

References

Chinese female pair skaters
1963 births
Living people
Olympic figure skaters of China
Figure skaters from Harbin
Figure skaters at the 1988 Winter Olympics